Gardell may refer to: 

 Billy Gardell (1969-), American actor and comedian
 Christer Gardell (1960-), Swedish venture capitalist
 Jonas Gardell (1963-), Swedish novelist, playwright, screenwriter and comedian
 Mattias Gardell (1959-), Swedish scholar of comparative religion
 Stina Gardell Swedish swimmer
 Anna Gardell-Ericson (1853 - 1939) Swedish artist